Preore (Praór in local dialect) was a comune (municipality) in Trentino in the northern Italian region Trentino-Alto Adige/Südtirol, located about  west of Trento.  It was merged with Montagne and Ragoli on January 1, 2016, to form a new municipality, Tre Ville.

Cities and towns in Trentino-Alto Adige/Südtirol